San Miguel Yotao  is a town and municipality in Oaxaca in south-western Mexico. The municipality covers an area of 58.69 km². 
It is part of the Ixtlán District in the Sierra Norte region.

As of 2005, the municipality had a total population of 632.

References

Municipalities of Oaxaca